Andrei Medvedev was the defending champion, and finished runner-up this year.

Carlos Costa won the tournament, beating Medvedev in the final, 4–6, 7–5, 6–4.

Seeds

Draw

Finals

Top half

Bottom half

External links
 Main draw

Singles